Portland Place in Bath, Somerset, England  was built around 1786 and many of the houses have been designated as listed buildings.

Numbers 1 to 10 including numbers 4 and 5 which were used as Hermitage House School are Grade I listed, as is the high pavement in front of them. In the centre of the steps is a double ramp which was built to enable easier access for sedan chairs.

Numbers 13 to 16 are Grade II listed. Numbers 17 to 20 follow a similar style and are also Grade II listed.  Numbers 17 and 20 have Roman Doric doorcases with pediments.

See also

 List of Grade I listed buildings in Bath and North East Somerset

References

Grade I listed buildings in Bath, Somerset
Buildings and structures in Bath, Somerset
Streets in Bath, Somerset